Kotsovolos is one of the leading electrical and electronics retailers in Greece. It started in a small neighborhood store downtown Athens in 1950 and today has a network of over 90 stores, in Greece and Cyprus, both corporate and franchise, as well as two online stores, kotsovolos.gr and kotsovolos.cy.

It has been a member of Dixons British company of electrical goods since 2005. In addition to retail, it provides after-sales support, installation, warranty and repair services, together with business-to-business services. The company's headquarters are located in New Heraklion, Attica.

History

1950s
Kotsovolos started in 1950 in a regional, small shop downtown Athens.

1990s 
In 1993 Kotsovolos was bought out by "Fourlis Trade S.A.".

In 1998 Kotsovolos bought out the "Radio Athinai" chain, expanding its network even further.

2000s 
Kotsovolos expanded into markets outside Greece and in May 2000 embarked on a strategic cooperation with the British multinational, Dixons Carphone plc.

In 2004 it joined forces with the Dixons Group with new privately owned stores, as well as through a franchise system. It renovated its stores in accordance with the international standards of the Dixons group and introduces a new store concept in the market, featuring total support coverage for appliances.

In 2007 it launched its online store www.kotsovolos.gr.

In 2008 Kotsovolos entered appliance recycling, recycling tons of electrical and electronic devices within a few years.

2010s 

In 2010 Kotsovolos launched the Support 360° integrated customer support umbrella of services, and introduces innovative products to the market, such as 3D TVs and Smart TVs.

In 2015, Kotsovolos celebrated its 65th anniversary with a technology exhibition at the Technopolis of Athens. Exhibits included appliances of the past and state-of-the-art appliances of the future that are not yet released in the Greek market. The Thanks to Tech annual technology exhibition was thus established. Free of charge and easily accessible to all, the exhibition presents technological innovations and devices that are not yet on the market, together with devices that have appeared only at the IFA International Exhibition.

Kotsovolos launched its first online show, "TryMe" on YouTube in 2015.

In 2016 the company presented the corporate social responsibility program "Second Home", which mobilizes those who own appliances that work but are not in use, to offer them to families in need.

In 2019, for the first time in the Greek market, Kotsovolos created the Pay Express service.

See also
List of companies of Greece

References

External links

Corporate website
Career website
Official Blog

Currys plc
Greek brands
Retail companies established in 1950
Retail companies of Greece

fr:Liste d'entreprises grecques